In telecommunication, a measuring receiver or measurement receiver is a calibrated laboratory-grade radio receiver designed to measure the characteristics of radio signals. The parameters of such receivers (tuning frequency, receiving bandwidth, gain) can usually be adjusted over a much wider range of values than is the case with other radio receivers. Their circuitry is optimized for stability and to enable calibration and reproducible results. Some measurement receivers also have especially robust input circuits that can survive brief impulses of more than 1000 V, as they can occur during measurements of radio signals on power lines and other conductors.

Applications
Measuring receivers are used with calibrated antennas to
 determine the signal-strength and standards-compliance of broadcast signals,
 investigate and quantify radio-frequency interference,
 determine compliance of a device with electromagnetic interference and TEMPEST standards and regulations.

Measuring receivers are also used without antennas to
 calibrate RF attenuators and signal generators.

Measuring receivers are widely used in metrology and calibration lab environments, spectrum monitoring and electromagnetic-compatibility facilities.

Types
Depending on the intended application area, several types of measuring receivers can be distinguished:
 Spectrum analyzers are intended to graphically display the amplitude spectrum of a radio signal on a logarithmic scale.
 Modulation analyzers are intended to accurately measure not only the signal power level, but also the degree of modulation (such as AM depth, FM/PM deviations), and modulation distortions.
 EMI receivers are designed to comply with the detailed equipment requirements of measurement standards for radio interference, such as the civilian specification CISPR 16-1-1 or the military specification MIL-STD 461. The EMI receiver has defined IF-Bandwidths (typically 200 Hz, 9 kHz, 120 kHz, 1 MHz) and standardized detector modes (peak, quasipeak, average, rms, CISPR-AV and CISPR-RMS, RMS-Average). They use a preselection for an improved dynamic range. Rohde & Schwarz holds the German Patent DE10126830B4 for RMS-Average Detector, which describes an implementation that allows to fulfill CISPR 16-1-1. Gauss Instruments builds EMI receivers that combine the novel technology of time-domain EMI measurement systems with traditional EMI Receivers.
 Time-domain EMI measurement systems and real-time EMI receiver are systems that perform a baseband sampling and simulate all the IF-Bandwidths and detectors digitally. Typically this is done via Short Time Fast Fourier Transform (STFFT). Such measurement systems emulate several thousand EMI receivers digitally in parallel. The most advanced instruments allow to speed up the measurement by a factor of 4000. Measurements can be performed according to the standards CISPR 16-1-1, MIL-STD 461 and DO-160. The benefit are extremely fast full compliance measurements. The measurements are performed with defined IF Bandwidths according to CISPR or MIL-STD 461F as well as DO160 and the detector modes (peak, quasipeak, average, rms, CISPR-AV and CISPR-RMS, RMS-Average). They use a preselection for an improved dynamic range. Gauss Instruments provides full compliance EMI Receivers with a real-time analysis bandwidth of 645 MHz with 2 parallel CISPR Detectors. Real-time Scanning over several GHz is also available on selected products.
 TEMPEST receivers are designed to comply with the requirements of measurement standards for compromising-emanations such as SDIP-27 or NSTISSAM TEMPEST/1-92. For example, their frequency range extends down to acoustic frequencies (typically 100 Hz), their bandwidth can be adjusted in 1-2-5 steps from a few hertz to more than 100 MHz, and their sensitivity and noise figure aims to be close to what is technically feasible.

Some measuring receivers (such as Agilent’s N5531S and MXE or Rohde & Schwarz's FSMR and ESU) also include a signal analyzer, power meter, and a sensor module to allow the instruments to be used together or individually for general-purpose measurement tasks.

The time-domain EMI measurement systems show additional features like weighted spectrogram mode, oscilloscope mode as well as measurement of discontinuous disturbance according to CISPR 14-1.

Requirements for Compliance Testing 

Receivers that are used for compliance testing have to fulfill the basic emc standard CISPR 16-1-1. CISPR 16-1-1 defines requirements for indication of CW Signals and pulses. The amplitude range where these requirements are met is called CISPR indication range. Within this range the receiver can be used for compliance tests. Usually EMI receivers have a CISPR indication range that starts about 6dB above the noise floor. The performance usually demonstrated by a linearity check for sinusoidal signals and broadband pulses. This linearity check is performed over the amplitude range starting from typical levels of 10dBuV. Some EMI receivers, even if called full compliant have a CISPR indication range that starts at higher levels e.g. 40dBuV. Typically for such a receivers only one level e.g. 60dBuV is presented. A demonstration of CISPR compliance at lower levels cannot be demonstrated.

See also
 Network analyzer (electrical)

References

External links
 Multi-page spectrum analyzer tutorial covering superheterodyne or swept frequency and FFT analyzers.
 Spectrum Analyzer / Measuring Receiver Tutorial and Basics
 Requirements of CISPR 16-1-1 Test Receivers, Spectrum Analyzers and FFT-Based Measuring Instruments 
 Practical Approach to EMI Diagnostics
 EMI Test Receiving System - Lisun

Electronic test equipment
Receiver (radio)

de:Messempfänger#Messempf.C3.A4nger